The 1992 United States Senate election in Kentucky took place on November 3, 1992. It was concurrent with elections to the United States House of Representatives. Incumbent Democratic U.S. Senator Wendell Ford won reelection to a fourth and final term. , this was the last time the Democrats won a U.S. Senate election in Kentucky.

Republican primary

Candidates
 Denny Ormerod, machinist
 Phillip Thompson, executive director of the Kentucky Republican Party
 David L. Williams, State Senator

Campaign
Denny Ormerod, a machinist from Louisville dropped out before the primary election. Though Williams and Thompson represented opposing factions in the state Republican Party – Williams managed Larry Hopkins' 1991 primary campaign while Thompson worked full-time for Hopkins' primary opponent Larry Forgy – the two virtually ignored each other in the primary campaign, choosing instead to focus their rhetoric against Ford. Thompson did question Williams' conservative credentials on grounds that he voted in favor of the tax increase associated with the Kentucky Education Reform Act. Ormerod's campaign largely focused on socially conservative issues, but it was Williams who secured the endorsement of Kentucky Right to Life, who cited his lawsuit to free three anti-abortion bills from committee in the 1992 legislative session. As a result of the largely uninspiring primary campaigns, there was only an 18% voter turnout in the Republican primary. Williams won the nomination.

Results

General election

Candidates
 Wendell Ford (D), incumbent U.S. Senator
 James Ridenour (L)
 David L. Williams (R), State Senator

Campaign
Ford, the Senate Majority Whip and a former governor, raised $2.4 million for his campaign, about eight times the amount Williams raised. Given his limited finances, Williams relied on news conferences and interviews on small town radio stations to get his message out. Williams repeatedly lamented that Ford would not agree to a formal debate; Ford said that could not be arranged because Congress was still in session and he needed to be in Washington. During the campaign, Williams attempted to paint Ford as too liberal for Kentucky voters, citing his votes against the Gulf War and Clarence Thomas' confirmation to the U.S. Supreme Court. Both candidates declared their support for a Balanced Budget Amendment, but Williams said that Ford's support of pork barrel projects for the state and a procedural vote that kept the amendment from a vote in 1991 were evidence that Ford's support was not genuine.

Results
Ford had no trouble winning on election night. Ford won easily, despite the fact that fellow Democrat Bill Clinton was not declared the winner of the presidential race in Kentucky until around 10:00 E.S.T. Ford pulled big margins out of the majority of Kentucky's 124 counties. This would be Ford's last term in the senate. He served his final term from January 3, 1993, to January 3, 1999. Ford died sixteen years after his retirement at the age of 90 in January 2015.

By county

See also
 1992 United States Senate elections
1992 United States presidential election
1992 United States elections

References

1992 Kentucky elections
Kentucky
1992